Inger Jørgensen (born 30 October 1930) is a retired Norwegian alpine skier. She was born in Asker. Jørgensen represented Asker SK, and is the sister of Dagny Jørgensen. She participated at the 1956 Winter Olympics in Cortina d'Ampezzo, where she competed in downhill, slalom and giant slalom. She became Norwegian champion in slalom in 1953 and 1954, and in giant slalom in 1956.

References

External links

1930 births
Living people
People from Asker
Norwegian female alpine skiers
Olympic alpine skiers of Norway
Alpine skiers at the 1956 Winter Olympics
Sportspeople from Viken (county)